This is a list of states in the Holy Roman Empire beginning with the letter O:

References

O